Catria may refer to:

Catria, playable character and one of the Whitewing Sisters from Fire Emblem: Shadow Dragon.
Monte Catria, the mountain located in central Apennines in Italy.
Catria horse, the Italian breed of horse from Monte Catria.